Buger (also romanized as Būger) is a village in Armand Rural District of Armand District, Khanmirza County, Chaharmahal and Bakhtiari province, Iran. At the 2006 census, its population was 2,301 in 448 households. The following census in 2011 counted 2,639 people in 625 households. The latest census in 2016 showed a population of 2,775 people in 734 households; it was the largest village in its rural district.

References 

Khanmirza County

Populated places in Chaharmahal and Bakhtiari Province

Populated places in Khanmirza County